Spalding Gray: Terrors of Pleasure is a 1987 filming of a monologue written and performed by Spalding Gray. The monologue is composed of material from the original stage performance Swimming to Cambodia that was not used in the 1987 film.

Overview
Gray chronicles the adventures he shared with his girlfriend, Renee, in the Catskills.  These took place in and around a cabin he purchased, there in Phoenicia, New York, including the apparent absence of any foundation, and a furnace located in the attic, which is not ideal, if one thinks to take normal heat-flow direction into account.

References

External links 
 

1987 films
1987 comedy films
Films directed by Thomas Schlamme
1980s English-language films
American comedy films
1980s American films